Fernando Charleston Hernández (born 13 October 1976) is a Mexican politician affiliated with the PRI. He served as Deputy of the LXII Legislature of the Mexican Congress representing Veracruz between 29 August 2012 and 28 August 2013.

References

1976 births
Living people
Politicians from Veracruz
Members of the Chamber of Deputies (Mexico)
Institutional Revolutionary Party politicians
21st-century Mexican politicians
People from Coatepec, Veracruz
Instituto Tecnológico Autónomo de México alumni
Universidad Iberoamericana alumni